Nyutyug is a rural locality (a selo) in Karchagsky Selsoviet, Suleyman-Stalsky District, Republic of Dagestan, Russia. The population was 1,231 as of 2010. There are 13 streets.

Geography 
Zizik is the nearest rural locality.

References 

Rural localities in Suleyman-Stalsky District